Russ Conway (1925–2000) was an English pianist.

Russ Conway may also refer to:

Russ Conway (actor) (1913–2009), Canadian-American actor
Russ Conway (journalist) (1949–2019), American journalist